Alney Island is an island in the River Severn near Gloucester, Gloucestershire, England. The Severn splits into two channels (known as East Channel and West Channel) at Upper Parting (the northernmost tip of Alney), and merges again at Lower Parting to the south. It is a local Nature Reserve.

Alney consists mostly of low-lying farmland, and parts are sometimes subject to flooding when the Severn rises. Castle Meads electrical substation on Alney was turned off when the island was flooded during the Summer 2007 United Kingdom floods.  In February 2014, Royal Marines and Army personnel were deployed to Alney Island to respond to severe flooding.

Telford's historic Over Bridge links Alney to Over across the West Channel, and is now pedestrian use only. The A40 and A417 trunk roads cross the West Channel on modern road bridges onto Alney before crossing the East Channel to join Gloucester at the end of Westgate Street. There are a number of Segregated Bicycle Paths around Alney. Alney is also crossed by the original South Wales Railway between Gloucester and Cardiff Central.

See also
Herefordshire and Gloucestershire Canal

References 

Islands of the River Severn
Landforms of Gloucestershire
Local Nature Reserves in Gloucestershire
River islands of England
Westgate, Gloucester